Pleasant Grove High School  is a public four year high school located in Elk Grove, California. Established in 2005, the first class of graduating seniors was the class of 2008. Pleasant Grove is the eighth high school of the Elk Grove Unified School District and has the highest API Score in District. The school's mascot is the Eagle, and the colors are navy blue, white and red.

Athletics 
The Pleasant Grove High School American football team won the Delta River league title three times from 2007 to 2009. It lost in the section title game in 2008, but won the 2010-11 Sac-Joaquin Section Division 1 Championship and started the 2011-2012 season ranked 8th in the US.

Notable alumni 

 Arik Armstead - American football defensive end
 Marquese Chriss - Professional basketball player
Cody Demps (born 1993) - basketball player for Hapoel Be'er Sheva of the Israeli Basketball Premier League
 Cole Hikutini - American football tight end
 Matt LaGrassa - soccer player
 Kyle Larson -  professional stock car racing driver
 Dylan Lupton - professional stock car racing driver
 Jalen Saunders - professional football player
 Xavier Thames -  professional basketball player
 Armond Armstead - former professional football player
 Ally Carda -  softball pitcher and first baseman
 Riley Voelkel - actress

References

External links 
 Official website
 Pleasant Grove Athletics Department website

Educational institutions established in 2005
High schools in Sacramento County, California
Public high schools in California
Elk Grove, California
2005 establishments in California